Lojodice is an Italian surname. Notable people with the surname include:

 Giuliana Lojodice (born 1940), Italian former stage, television and film actress
 Severino Lojodice (born 1933), retired Italian professional footballer

Italian-language surnames